Governor Drummond may refer to:

Gordon Drummond (1772–1854), Governor General of the Canadas from 1815 to 1816
William Drummond (colonial governor) (died 1677), 1st Colonial Governor of Albemarle Sound settlement in the Province of Carolina